is a hot spring resort district in northern Japan about  to the northwest of downtown Sendai, Miyagi Prefecture.

History
Local legend attributes the foundation of Sakunami Onsen to the wandering Buddhist priest Gyōki in 721 AD In the early Kamakura period. The Azuma Kagami records that Minamoto no Yoritomo visited the area during his campaign against the Northern Fujiwara at Hiraizumi.

Sakunami has a number of ryokan which were founded in the Edo period under the auspices of the Sendai Domain. The onsen cluster is on the steep banks of the Hirosegawa River that eventually flows through downtown Sendai.

Transport
Trains on the Senzan Line from Sendai Station to Yamagata Station stop at Sakunami Station, a trip that takes roughly 40 minutes from Sendai.

References

External links
Official home page 

Sendai
Hot springs of Miyagi Prefecture
Spa towns in Japan
Tourist attractions in Miyagi Prefecture